Stuart Woods (born Stuart Chevalier Lee, January 9, 1938 – July 22, 2022) was an American novelist, known best for his first novel Chiefs and his series of novels featuring the Stone Barrington character.

Early life
Stuart Woods was born in Manchester, Georgia, and graduated in 1959 from the University of Georgia, with a Bachelor of Arts in sociology. After graduation, he enrolled in the Air National Guard, spending two months in basic training before moving to New York City, where he began a career in the advertising industry. Towards the end of the 1960s, Woods emigrated to England and lived in Knightsbridge, London while continuing to work in advertising. After three years in London, Woods decided to write a novel, based on an old family story that had been told to him when he was a child, and moved to Ireland. He moved into a converted barn on the grounds of Lough Cutra Castle near Gort, County Galway, and lived a near-solitary existence, except for spending two days a week in Dublin writing television commercials and print advertisements.

Sailing
Soon after settling in Ireland in 1973, Woods took up a new hobby of sailing, an activity that had interested him since the summer of 1966 in Castine, Maine, when friends had taken him on their boat. He joined Galway Bay Sailing Club, and learned to sail in one of the club's Mirrors. Woods purchased a Mirror for himself and named it Fred, after his dog. After tiring of cruising around bays, he entered novice competitions around Galway Bay. Unable to find a reliable person to form his crew, Woods recruited any passing teenager to join him. He entered the week-long National Championships at Lough Derg, and finished 39th out of a fleet of 60. It was Woods' best result of the season.

The following year, Woods sailed in as many races as he could leading up to the Mirror National Championships in Sligo. After retiring from the first race, he finished in 25th place out of 70 boats in the second race, and finished eighth in the third race. The fourth race was cancelled due to high winds and the number of teenaged entrants. He finished the event 29th out of 70 boats, and his crewmate and he were given a special prize for being the oldest and heaviest crew. For the rest of the season, he sailed around Ireland with a friend on a Snapdragon 24, and decided to compete in the 1976 Observer Single-handed Trans-Atlantic Race (OSTAR).

In the fall of 1974, Woods's grandfather died and bequeathed him enough money to buy a yacht suitable for the race. He ordered a Golden Shamrock-based yacht from Ron Holland, and worked with him on designing the interior suitable for single-handed racing and Woods' personal needs. Since his previous sailing experience consisted of "racing a 10-foot plywood dinghy on Sunday afternoons against small children, losing regularly", Woods spent 18 months learning more about sailing and celestial navigation, while his yacht was being built in Cork. He gained more boating experience by sailing from Ireland to England as part of the crew on STY Creidne, a training ship purchased by the Irish government for the Irish Naval Service, Irish Mist II, Ron Holland's  Golden Apple, and as many other yachts that would accept him, amassing 1200 miles of offshore experience. He entered the August 1975 Multihull Offshore Cruising and Racing Association (MOCRA) Azores Race and asked fellow Galway Bay Sailing Club member Commander Bill King to join him.

To finance his MOCRA Azores Race and the OSTAR, Woods met with publishers about writing a book about his experience in the OSTAR, organized sponsorship for the races, and sent invitations and press releases about the launch of his yacht to the local and national Irish media, RTÉ, The Observer, and Yachting Monthly. Golden Harp was launched June 4, 1975. "Golden" was chosen so the boat followed the naming tradition of Ron Holland's other designs, the Golden Apple, Golden Shamrock, and Golden Delicious, and "Harp" as it has long been used as a symbol of Ireland.

Woods, King, and their third crewmember, Shirley Clifford, left from Portsmouth, England, for the Azores in August 1975. Clifford, who had complained of feeling ill the day before the race began, continued to feel worse, so Woods and King dropped her off on a coast guard boat near Plymouth, England, on the second day of the race. They arrived in Horta after sailing 1400 miles for 15 days. They were the smallest and last boat to finish, other than four boats that had retired from the race, but were disqualified for not competing with the full crew complement that had begun the race. King returned to Ireland almost immediately, but Woods spent a month in Horta before sailing Golden Harp the 1300 miles back to Ireland single-handedly  to meet the OSTAR's qualifying cruise requirement of a minimum of 500 miles.

Upon his return to Ireland in the late fall of 1975, Woods appeared on the Irish version of To Tell the Truth with Ron Holland and John McWilliam. All three men claimed to be Woods, and a panel had to guess who was lying. Only one of the four panelists guessed correctly. Preparing for his OSTAR race, he petitioned the OSTAR Committee to be considered an Irish entry, as although he was an American, he had been living in Ireland for some time, had learned to sail from Irish yachtsmen on Irish boats, and his yacht was Irish designed and built. The committee agreed to allow him to be entered under Irish colors.

Becoming a published writer
Woods wrote an account of his OSTAR experience, and was introduced to Stanford Maritime, a London-based publishing house specializing in nautical books, by Ron Holland. Blue Water, Green Skipper was published in 1977. The American publishing rights were sold to W.W. Norton.

Woods' second book was to be written about the 1977 Round Britain Yacht Race, but the book was cancelled because of light winds and calms during the race. He persuaded his publishers to allow him to change the scope of the book, and spent the summer driving 12,000 miles around Great Britain and Ireland, writing a guidebook to country restaurants, inns, and hotels. He visited over 150 establishments, and included 138 in the book; 91 establishments in England, 13 in Scotland, eight in Wales, and 26 in Ireland. The two places in the British Isles that he did not visit were Northern Ireland, saying that he did not feel comfortable recommending any place where he was afraid to visit, and the Channel Islands due to a lack of available time. Originally titled A Lover's Guide to the Country Inns of Britain and Ireland Woods realised married couples may feel alienated, and changed it to A Romantic's Guide ..., defining a "romantic" as a person " who is susceptible to charm" in addition to The Concise Oxford Dictionary definition of someone "given to romance, imagination ... visionary ... professing grandeur of picturesqueness or passion or irregular beauty to finish and proportion."

Woods' first novel, Chiefs, was published in March 1981. The story was inspired by a police chief's badge Woods had found in his grandmother's home. The badge was stained with blood and pockmarked by buckshot. It had belonged to his grandfather, who died wearing it 10 years before Woods was born. He submitted the first 100 pages and an outline to three publishers, all of whom turned him down, before Norton bought the publishing rights for $7,500. He later stated it was a mistake to sell the book unfinished, as he could have gotten much more money had it been completed. About 20,000 copies of the book were printed in hardback, but Norton did little to promote it. He contracted with Bantam Books to print the paperback edition. In 1983, Chiefs was adapted into a television miniseries of the same name, starring Charlton Heston, Danny Glover, Billy Dee Williams, Stephen Collins, and John Goodman. CBS broadcast the miniseries over three nights, and it was nominated for three Emmy Awards and one Eddie Award. Its success sparked interest in the paperback, and Woods was awarded the Edgar Award in the "Best First Novel" category from the Mystery Writers of America.

Woods' most prolific series of novels focus on Stone Barrington, a former NYPD detective turned lawyer, who is of counsel to a prestigious law firm and handles sensitive cases for the firm's prominent clients, but cases with which the firm nonetheless does not wish to be publicly associated. As such, Barrington commands exorbitant fees, and a strong cast of recurring characters such as his ex-partner Dino Bacchetti, frequent use of the restaurant Elaine's on the Upper East Side of Manhattan in New York City as a setting, and Stone's frequent exploits with women, travel, and fine dining. Stone, like Woods, was also an experienced pilot and frequent references are made to his aircraft.

In addition to Stone, Woods authored several other character-focused series, including Holly Barker, a retired Army major and Florida police chief recruited to become a CIA operative; Ed Eagle, a Santa Fe defense lawyer; William Henry Lee IV, a United States senator from Georgia who is elected President of the United States; and Rick Barron, a police detective who becomes a security officer and later chief of production for a Hollywood movie studio in the 1930s. All of Woods' novels take place in the same universe, and characters frequently appear in other series.

Woods has published a memoir, a travel book, and 44 novels in a37-year career, and had 29 consecutive The New York Times best sellers in hardback. Two completed novels were awaiting publication in January and April, 2011, and he then signed another three-book deal with Putnam. At one time in his literary output, Woods wrote two novels a year and subsequently increased that to three novels a year, at the request of his publishers. In 2014, he started publishing four times a year, in January, April, June/July, and October.
|

Personal life
Woods was a licensed, instrument-rated private pilot and bought a new Cessna Citation Mustang, his first jet airplane. He was the launch customer of the Cessna Citation M2, taking delivery of the plane in December 2013.  He owned a Hinckley T38 R power boat and was a partner in an 85-foot antique motor yacht, Enticer, built in 1935 and fully restored. Married to Jeanmarie (née Cooper) in January 2013, the couple lived with a Labrador Retriever named Fred in Key West, Florida, on Mount Desert Island, in Maine, and Santa Fe, New Mexico.

Bibliography

Will Lee novels
 Chiefs (1981) (Edgar Award Best First Novel) – A 229-minute TV miniseries, starring Charlton Heston, John Goodman and an all-star cast. (Woods has a role in miniseries)
 Run Before the Wind (1983)
 Deep Lie (1986)
 Grass Roots (1989) – A four-hour TV miniseries, starring Corbin Bernsen and Mel Harris.
 The Run (2000)
 Capital Crimes (2003) (First appearance of villain Teddy Fay)
 Mounting Fears (2009) (Teddy Fay appearance #4) (Holly Barker also makes an appearance)

Stone Barrington novels
 New York Dead (1991)
 Dirt (1996)
 Dead in the Water (1997)
 Swimming to Catalina (1998)
 Worst Fears Realized (1999)
 L.A. Dead (2000)
 Cold Paradise (2001)
 The Short Forever (2002) (First appearance of CIA agent Lance Cabot)
 Dirty Work (2003) (First appearance of Herbie Fisher)
 Reckless Abandon (2004) (Also stars Holly Barker, Lance Cabot, and Ed Eagle) (Continuation of a storyline in Blood Orchid) (Herbie Fisher makes a cameo)
 Two Dollar Bill (2005)
 Dark Harbor (2006) (Also stars Holly Barker)
 Fresh Disasters (2007) (Herbie Fisher Appearance)
 Shoot Him If He Runs (2007) (Also stars Holly Barker) (Teddy Fay Appearance #3)
 Hot Mahogany (2008) (Also stars Holly Barker)
 Loitering With Intent (2009) (Chuck Chandler from Choke makes a cameo)
 Kisser (2010)
 Lucid Intervals (2010) (First appearance of Strategic Services and Mike Freeman)
 Strategic Moves (2011) (Also stars Holly Barker, cameo appearances by Todd Bacon and Lance Cabot)
 Bel-Air Dead (2011) (Cameos by Ed Eagle, Barbara Eagle and Rick Barron)
 Son of Stone (2011)
 D.C. Dead (2011) (Also stars Holly Barker and Will Lee) (Teddy Fay Appearance #7)
 Unnatural Acts (2012)  (Also stars Herbie Fisher)
 Severe Clear (2012)  (Also stars Holly Barker and Will Lee)
 Collateral Damage (2013) (Also stars Holly Barker and Will Lee, Continuation of story line Severe Clear)
 Unintended Consequences (2013) (Also stars Holly Barker and Lance Cabot, timeline starts immediately following events in Collateral Damage. References events in Deep Lie)
 Doing Hard Time (2013) (Teddy Fay Appearance #8, Continuation of story line Unintended Consequences)
 Standup Guy (2014)
 Carnal Curiosity (2014) (Cameos by Holly Barker, Lance Cabot, Teddy Fay, Will Lee and Kate Lee)
 Cut and Thrust (2014) (Also stars Will Lee, Kate Lee, Ed Eagle, Barbara Eagle and Teddy Fay (Billy Burnett))
 Paris Match (2014) (Also stars Lance Cabot & Holly Barker, Continuation of story line Doing Hard Time)
 Insatiable Appetites (2015) (Cameos by Will Lee and Kate Lee)
 Hot Pursuit (2015) (Also stars Holly Barker,Lance Cabot, Will Lee and Kate Lee)
 Naked Greed (2015) (Cameo by Holly Barker)
 Foreign Affairs (2015) (Stone's escapees take him to Rome) (Cameos by Holly Barker, Kate Lee, & Lance Cabot)
 Scandalous Behavior (2016) (a continuation of Foreign Affairs, takes place mostly in England, with an appearance from Teddy Fay)
 Family Jewels (2016) (a cameo from Ed Eagle, Kate Lee, Will Lee, Lance Cabot, & Holly Barker)
 Dishonorable Intentions (2016) (a cameo from Ed Eagle, Kate Lee, Lance Cabot, Holly Barker and an appearance from Billy Burnett (Teddy Fay))
 Sex, Lies, and Serious Money (2016) (Stars Herb Fisher) (cameos from Ed Eagle, Holly Barker and Billy Burnett (Teddy Fay))
 Below the Belt (2017) (Stars Holly Barker, Lance Cabot, Will Lee, cameo by Kate Lee)
 Fast and Loose (2017) (a continuation of Below the Belt, cameos from Billy Burnett (Teddy Fay), Kate Lee, Will Lee, Lance Cabot & Holly Barker)
 Indecent Exposure (2017) (Stars Holly Barker, Will Lee, & Kate Lee)
 Quick & Dirty (2017) (Cameo by Holly Barker)
 Unbound (2018) (Stars Billy Burnett (Teddy Fay) & cameo from Ed Eagle)
 Shoot First (Think Later) (2018) (Cameos from Lance Cabot and Holly Barker)
 Turbulence (2018) (a continuation of the villain from Shoot First, stars Holly Barker and Lance Cabot)
 Desperate Measures (2018) (Stars Herb Fisher)
 A Delicate Touch (2018) (Cameo by Holly Barker)
 Wild Card (2019) (A continuation of A Delicate Touch, cameos from Holly Barker and Lance Cabot)
 Contraband (2019) (Cameo by Holly Barker)
 Stealth (2019) (Stars Holly Barker & Lance Cabot)
 Treason (2020)
 Hit List (2020)
 Choppy Water (2020)
 Shakeup (2020)
 Hush-Hush (2020)
 Double Jeopardy (2021)
 Class Act (2021)
 Foul Play (2021)
 Criminal Mischief (2021)
 A Safe House (2022)
 Black Dog (2022)
 Distant Thunder (October 11, 2022)
 Near Miss (with Brett Battles) ( June 6, 2023)

Holly Barker novels
 Orchid Beach – set in the fictional town of Orchid Beach, FL (1998)
 Orchid Blues (2001) (Stone Barrington makes a cameo)
 Blood Orchid (2002)
 Iron Orchid (2005) (Teddy Fay Appearance #2)
 Hothouse Orchid (2009) (Teddy Fay Appearance #5)

Ed Eagle novels
 Santa Fe Rules – set in Santa Fe, New Mexico (1992)
 Short Straw (2006) (Rick Barron makes a cameo appearance)
 Santa Fe Dead (2008)
 Santa Fe Edge (2010) (Teddy Fay Appearance #6, Holly Barker makes a cameo and Agent Todd Bacon from Mounting Fears returns)

Rick Barron novels
 The Prince of Beverly Hills (2004)
 Beverly Hills Dead (2008) (Stone Barrington makes a cameo)

Teddy Fay novels
-These novels also feature Stone Barrington-
 Smooth Operator (with Parnell Hall) (2016)
 The Money Shot (with Parnell Hall) (2018)
 Skin Game (with Parnell Hall) (2019)
 Bombshell (with Parnell Hall) (2020)
 Jackpot (with Bryon Quertermous) (2021)
 Obsession (with Brett Battles) (July 25, 2023)

Herbie Fisher novels
 Barely Legal (with Parnell Hall) (2017) (Features Stone Barrington)

Stand-alone novels
 Under the Lake (1987)
 White Cargo  (1988)
 Palindrome – set in Cumberland Island, GA (1991)
 L.A. Times – set in Los Angeles, California (1993)
 Dead Eyes – set in Los Angeles, California (1994)
 Heat – set in a fictional town in Idaho (1994)
 Imperfect Strangers (1995) (Grand Prix de Littérature Policière)
 Choke (1995)

Non-fiction
 Blue Water, Green Skipper: A Memoir of Sailing Alone Across the Atlantic  (1977, reissue August 2, 2012)
 A Romantic's Guide to the Country Inns of Britain and Ireland (1979)
 An Extravagant Life (June 7, 2022) [A new memoir that will incorporate Blue Water, Green Skipper with new material]

Book reviews
Unintended Consequences
New York Journal of Books reviewer Carolyn Haley called Unintended Consequences ". . . reliably fun and intriguing."

References

External links
Stuart Woods's official website

1938 births
2022 deaths
20th-century American novelists
21st-century American novelists
American mystery writers
American male novelists
Edgar Award winners
Novelists from Georgia (U.S. state)
University of Georgia alumni
People from Manchester, Georgia
Irish male sailors (sport)
20th-century American male writers
21st-century American male writers